Dubensky District  is an administrative district (raion), one of the twenty-three in Tula Oblast, Russia. Within the framework of municipal divisions, it is incorporated as Dubensky Municipal District. It is located northwest of the oblast. Its administrative center is the urban locality (a work settlement) of Dubna. Population: 14,618 (2010 Census);  The population of Dubna accounts for 40.9% of the district's total population.

References

Notes

Sources

Districts of Tula Oblast